Le donne curiose (English: The Inquisitive Women) is an opera in three acts by Ermanno Wolf-Ferrari to a text by  after Carlo Goldoni's play .

Performance history
The first dramatic work by Wolf-Ferrari to achieve more than local notice, it was first performed in Munich on 27 November 1903 in a German translation as Die neugierigen Frauen. The first performance in Italian was at the old Metropolitan Opera House in New York on 3 January 1912 with a cast led by Arturo Toscanini, including Geraldine Farrar and Hermann Jadlowker. Tullio Serafin conducted the first performance in Milan on 16 January 1913.

Roles

Synopsis
The story is a comedy set in 18th-century Venice about two wives checking up on the goings-on at their husband's club.

Notes

References
Warrack, John and West, Ewan (1992), The Oxford Dictionary of Opera, 782 pages,

External links
 
 
 Work details, opera-guide.ch

Operas by Ermanno Wolf-Ferrari
Italian-language operas
Opera buffa
1903 operas
Operas
Operas based on plays
Operas set in Venice
Operas based on works by Carlo Goldoni